KS3 or KS-3 may refer to:

 Kansas's 3rd congressional district, United States House of Representatives
 K-3 (Kansas highway), an American road
 Key Stage 3, of British secondary education
 KS-3 Cropmaster, an Australian agricultural aircraft